Don Juan is a musical written by Félix Gray in 2003. Don Juan was presented in Canada (mainly Quebec and Ottawa) and in France with a total of 600,000 viewers all over the world. The cast also went to South Korea. The soundtrack of the musical saw sales of more than 300,000 copies. The show had a run until 2006. 

The original cast was Jean-François Breau in the role of Don Juan and Marie-Ève Janvier in the role of Maria, as well as the 2012 revival.

Soundtrack
A double album was released containing the songs from the production. The songs were composed by Félix Gray and the orchestra was conducted by Guy St-Onge. Singers included Guy St-Onge, Antoine Cortes, Chico Castillo, Dominique Faure, Jorge Heredia and released on Cloutier.

Track list
(Songs not found in the soundtrack marked by **)
(Songs not appearing in the show marked by *)

Disc 1 (Act 1)
Ouverture ... Un grand homme est mort 
L'Homme qui a tout
Cœur de Pierre
Mon nom 
Dis-lui**
Dites-lui
Une meche de cheveux*
Mon fils 
Les fleurs du mal
Du plaisir
Vivir
Belle Andalouse
N'as-tu pas honte?
Les femmes
Reste encore
L'amour quand il vient
Statue de Pierre
Aimer
Le Sang des soldats

Disc 2 - Act 2	
Les amoureux de Seville
Changer
Qui?
Je pense à lui
Deux à aimer* (This song does not appear in the 2012 revival (Replaced by L'amour est plus fort))
Venge-nous
Seulement l'amour
Maria
Jalousie
Demain à l'aube**
Pourquoi le bruit
Pitie pour personne
Les anges
L'enfant du diable
Seul
Tristesa Andalucia
Duel à l'aube
Je meurs d'amour
Don Juan est mort

Encore
Les amoureux de Seville
Changer* (This song does not appear in the 2012 revival (Replaced by Nous on veut de l'amour))

Actors
Original version-2004

Don Juan: Jean-François Breau/understudy: René Lajoie
Maria: Marie-Ève Janvier/understudies: Geneviève Charest / Marie-Pier Barnabé
Don Carlos: Mario Pelchat//understudy: Dany Laliberté
Don Luis: Claude Leveillée / Claude Gauthier/understudy: René Lajoie
Raphaël: Philippe Berghella understudy: Benoit Miron
Isabel: Cassiopéeunderstudy: Geneviève Charest
Elvira: Cindy Daniel/understudy : Marie-Pier Barnabé

Paris Cast-2005

Don Juan: Jean-François Breault / understudy: Stephane Neville
Maria: Marie-Eve Janvier / Understudy: Anne-Celine Lopez
Don Carlos: Mario Pelchat / understudy: René Lajoie
Don Luis: Claude Lancelot / understudy: René Lajoie
Raphaël: Philippe Berghella / understudy: Stephane Neville
Isabel: Geneviève Charest / understudy: Amandine
Elvira: Cindy Daniel / understudy: Anne-Céline Lopez

2012 version
Don Juan: Jean-François Breau
Maria: Marie-Ève Janvier
Don Carlos: Étienne Drapeau
Raphaël: Jonathan Roy
Isabel: Amélie B. Simard 
Elvira - Natasha St-Pier 
Don Luis - Normand Lévesque

References

2003 musicals
French musicals